Juan Fernando Sarrachini Donati (29 January 1946 – 27 January 2012) was an Argentine footballer who played as a midfielder.

Football career
In the 1969–70 season played in La Liga with Mallorca. A season later he went to Hércules, where he played 4 seasons in Second Division. Hércules signed on July 23, 1970 at Sarrachini from RCD Mallorca and José Luque Puerta from Atlético Baleares. These signings were thanks to the efforts of the technical secretary of Hércules, Jesús Berenguer. In the 1973–74 season won promotion to La Liga. Arsenio Iglesias told him not to play in La Liga, and the player went to AD Almería, where he played one year. He died in January 2012 in the Argentine town of Villa Amelia.

References

External links
 
 Biographical newspaper article 

1946 births
2012 deaths
Footballers from Santa Fe, Argentina
Argentine footballers
Association football midfielders
Newell's Old Boys footballers
RCD Mallorca players
Hércules CF players
AD Almería footballers
Argentine Primera División players
La Liga players
Argentine expatriate footballers
Argentine expatriate sportspeople in Spain